The Gundlakamma River is a seasonal waterway that flows through the east-central part of the state of Andhra Pradesh, India. It arises in the Nallamala Hills, an offshoot of the Eastern Ghats. Its main headwaters lie some 6 kilometers from the village of Ardhaveedu, Prakasam district at an altitude of 425 m. above MSL. Numerous mountain streams join it as it descends down the thickly forested hills through a series of curves and tight bends. It follows a north-easterly direction and enters the plains near Cumbum, after flowing through a town named after it. Gundlakamma is the largest of all the rivers that originate from the Nallamalla Hills.

A 15th-century dam built by the Gajapati kings straddles the river on its entry into the plains. It is an earthen dam that plugs the river flows through. The river then flows past the town of Markapur and towards the Coromandel Coast through Addanki town. It finally enters the Bay of Bengal, some 19 km east of Ongole after having covered a distance of 225 km.

Dams

Apart from the ancient dam at Cumbum mentioned above, a modern dam called Gundlakamma Reservoir Project too has been constructed across the river at Mallavaram, Prakasam District. It will also  provide drinking water for the 250,000 people living in Ongole and its surrounding hamlets. The lower part of the river basin is irrigated by Krishna river water through Nagarjuna Sagar right bank canal.

Veligonda Project is under construction to connect the river basin with the adjacent Krishna River basin by a 20 km long tunnel from the Srisailam reservoir. Construction of a 40 Tmcft capacity storage reservoir is also part of this project. Once this project is completed, the reliability of water supply to all the irrigation projects in the river basin would enhance vastly.

Bridges
The Guntur–Guntakal railway track of the Guntur railway division crosses the river over the embankment at Cumbum as well as at two other places before it. The Vijayawada–Chennai mainline of the same railway crosses the river a few kilometres before its mouth(Karavadi Village). Near the same place, National Highway 5 also spans the river at Vellampalli village. This is a seasonal river.

Floods
Though a tamed river generally, the heavy monsoonal rains in 2001 caused the river to burst its banks and flood areas along its course. About 15 people were washed away by its gushing waters in the month of October, 2001.

Nature tourism
Gundla Brahmeswara Sanctuary is located in the river basin.

References

External links 
 Gundlakamma river on the OpenStreetMap

Rivers of Andhra Pradesh
Geography of Prakasam district
Rivers of India